Events from the year 1850 in France.

Events
15 April - Angers Bridge collapses with around 480 soldiers marching across it; about 226 are killed.
16 May - Battleship Le Napoléon is launched.
France begins to transport colonists to Algeria.

Births
14 January - Pierre Loti, sailor and writer (died 1923)
31 May - Alphonse Pénaud, aeronautical pioneer (died 1880)
5 August - Guy de Maupassant, writer (died 1893)
6 August - Henri Chantavoine, writer (died 1918)
25 August - Charles Richet, physiologist, awarded Nobel Prize for Physiology or Medicine in 1913 (died 1935)

Deaths

January to June
22 January - William Joseph Chaminade, priest, beatified (born 1761)
22 March - Sophie d'Arbouville, writer (born 1810)
16 April - Marie Tussaud, wax sculptor (born 1761)
1 May - Henri Marie Ducrotay de Blainville, zoologist and anatomist (born 1777)
9 May - Joseph Louis Gay-Lussac, chemist and physicist (born 1778)

July to December
18 August - Honoré de Balzac, novelist and playwright (born 1799)
26 August - Louis-Philippe of France, last king of France (born 1773)
9 November - François-Xavier-Joseph Droz, writer on ethics, political science and political economy (born 1773)
10 December - François Sulpice Beudant, mineralogist and geologist (born 1787)
24 December - Frédéric Bastiat, writer and political economist (born 1801)

Full date unknown
Armand-Benjamin Caillau, Roman Catholic priest, a missionary and writer (born 1794)

References

1850s in France